Chloropterus pallidus is a species of leaf beetle of Algeria, described by the French entomologist  in 1898.

References

Eumolpinae
Beetles of North Africa
Beetles described in 1898